Gelasiminae is a subfamily that pertains to nine out of the eleven fiddler crab genera within the family Ocypodidae.

Taxonomy
The subfamily includes 94 species within nine genera. The genera are split into two tribes that are geographically distant. Tribe Gelasimini consists of species native to the Indo-West Pacific whereas Tribe Minucini consists of species native to the Americas.

Tribe Gelasimini (Indo-West Pacific fiddlers):
 Austruca
 Cranuca
 Gelasimus
 Paraleptuca
 Tubuca
 Xeruca
Tribe Minucini (American broad-front fiddlers): 
 Leptuca
 Minuca
 Petruca

References

Crabs
Arthropod subfamilies